James Birrell (1928-2019) was an architect responsible for the design of significant buildings in Queensland, Australia. James Birrell practiced from 1951 to 1986.

Personal life
James Peter Birrell was born in Melbourne on the 24 October 1928, the eldest child of Harry and Elizabeth Birrell. Growing up in Essendon North, Birrell attended North Essendon Primary School from 1934–40 and Essendon State High School from 1940–44.

In 1945 at the age of 17 James Birrell was accepted into the Melbourne Technical College as an architecture student. To help finance his studies Birrell worked part-time as a builder's labourer. In 1947 Birrell began work as a draughtsman for the Victorian State Works Department and continued his studies Part-time. The same year he also became involved in the Contemporary Arts Society, through the Society he gained many new friends, notably Peter Burns.

In 1950 Birrell was accepted into Fourth Year Architecture at the University of Melbourne. In 1951 he graduated and designed his first houses, in Frankston and Warrandyte, Birrell also worked briefly as the resident Architect at the Commonwealth Serum Laboratories.

In 1952 Birrell co-founded the magazine Architecture and Arts with his contemporaries, Peter Burns, Helen O'Donnell and Norman Lehey. In 1954 Birrell contributed to the Contemporary Arts Society's exhibition 'Space Modulators' along with artists including Sidney Nolan, Ian Fairweather, Charles Blackman, Arthur Boyd and John Perceval.

Working for the Commonwealth Works Department, Birrell was transferred to Canberra, before going on to Darwin and finally Brisbane. In Brisbane James Birrell went on to become Brisbane City Council Architect and University of Queensland Staff Architect. It was during this period that Birrell designed his most significant buildings.

Throughout his life Birrell admired the works of Walter Burley Griffin and in 1964 he wrote a biography on Griffin.

In March 1985 James Birrell was elected as a councillor for the Shire of Maroochy in Queensland.

Birrell's archive is held at the Fryer Library at the University of Queensland and the State Library of Queensland.

Birrell died 20 September 2019.

Notable projects

Brisbane City Council ArchitectIn 1956 as Brisbane City Council Architect Birrell designed the Chermside and Annerley Libraries, Centenary Pool Complex at Spring Hill as well as numerous public amenities. In 1957 his design proposal for the Centenary Pool complex was successful with construction finishing in 1959. Architecture and Arts magazine named the building as one of the top ten buildings within Australia.

Birrell also designed the former Toowong Municipal Library Building, which was completed in 1961. Located on Coronation Drive, it was directly opposite to Birrell's Toowong Pool (which has since been demolished). The library is heritage listed although is now used for commercial purposes (medical imaging-MRI).

University of Queensland Staff Architect

From 1961–66 James Birrell practiced as The University of Queensland Staff Architect. In this position he designed and documented Union College, which was constructed in five stages from 1964 and 1972. Union College was highly commended after its construction. It was visually pleasing while also being innovative in terms of the structure and its response to pre-existing site conditions. Union College received a High Commendation award from Arts and Architecture journal as one of the best ten new buildings in Australia at the time.

During his tenure as staff architect James Birrell was also responsible for the JD Story Administration Building (1965) the Agriculture and Entomology Building, now known as the Hartley Teakle Building (1966). Birrell was also responsible for the design of the campus plan at James Cook University in Townsville, and several of its early buildings 1964–1970. In 1965 Birrell became President of the Australian Planning Institute.

Private Practice

In 1966 he moved into private practice. Much of Birrell's work in this period came from overseas. He worked for the University of Papua New Guinea, where he designed the Halls of Residence, Arts/Law and Arts II Buildings and Indonesia as a government planning consultant.

Works
 Toowong Municipal Library and Pool designed while City Council Architect.
 Union College Building designed while University of Queensland Staff.
 Wickham Terrace Car Park
 Private residence - 4 Carol Court, Buderim, Qld
 Nambour Council Building / Shire Chambers, Library and town square 
 Brisbane Centenary Pool Centre
Annerley Library, Brisbane
 University Hall of Residence, James Cook University
 Eddie Koiki Mabo Library, James Cook University
 Ken Back Chancellory Building, James Cook University
 JD Story Administration Building – University of Queensland
 Agriculture and Entomology Building (Hartley Teakle Building) – University of Queensland
 Papua New Guinea Banking Corporation (PNGBC) (now Bank South Pacific), headquarters – Port Moresby, Papua New Guinea
 Agriculture Bank – Port Moresby, Papua New Guinea
University of Queensland Staff and Graduates Club

Awards
 Union College, University of Queensland, RAIA High Commendation (1966)
 JD Story Administration Building, University of Queensland, RAIA Commendation
 Agriculture and Entomology Building (Hartley Teakle Building), University of Queensland, RAIA Citation (1970)

In 2005 Birrell was awarded the RAIA Gold Medal. Royal Australian Institute of Architects national president Warren Kerr said the Melbourne-born Brisbane-based architect had made a "spirited and distinguished contribution to the discipline of architecture".

Tributes
 The University of Queensland Staff and Graduates Club have a room named the "James Birrell Room".
 Architecture students in the University of Queensland's Faculty of Engineering, Architecture and Information Technology's Scholars program are known as Birrell Scholars. The program provides the Faculty's top students with enhanced academic, industry and cultural experiences.

References

External links 
 Collection UQFL117 - James Birrell Papers, Fryer Library, University of Queensland
 James Peter Birrell Papers, State Library of Queensland
 James Birrell oral history, State Library of Queensland

1928 births
Architects from Brisbane
2019 deaths
Recipients of the Royal Australian Institute of Architects’ Gold Medal
Architects from Melbourne
20th-century Australian architects
People from Essendon, Victoria
University of Melbourne alumni